Tideland Signal, sometimes referred to as Tidelands, was a privately held, Houston, Texas based manufacturer of marine navigational aids, with main offices in Lafayette, Louisiana, Vancouver, British Columbia, Canada, Burgess Hill, UK, Dubai, United Arab Emirates and Singapore. It was the manufacturer of the ML-300 lantern, widely used in lighthouses around the world for more than 50 years. In 2016, Tideland was acquired by Xylem. In 2020 it ceased operations.

History
Tideland Signal was founded by several salesmen of Automatic Power, a battery manufacturer which was then a primary player in the buoy market. The company originally sold directly to Automatic's market, but with limited success.

During the 1960s, solar cells had started to become practical systems for recharging batteries in remote locations. Hoffman Electronics, a pioneer in solar power, had approached Automatic with the idea of placing panels on their buoys to reduce the number of battery replacements needed to keep a site operations. Automatic instead saw this as a serious threat to their business, so they purchased the Hoffman concept and buried it.

Shortly thereafter, a research division of Exxon was in the process of introducing their own solar panels. Examining the market, they saw that Tideland was struggling with 30% market share, and approached them. Tideland took up development, introducing a buoy with rechargeable batteries and a solar panel. It was an immediate success, and the company soon eclipsed Automatic. By the late 1970s the solar-powered buoy was widely used.

In 1965 Tideland introduced the world first transistorized automatic lamp changer. In 1967 Tideland introduced a  acrylic Fresnel lens lantern, the ML-300, which is still widely used.

In June 2012, Rock Hill Capital closed a majority recapitalization of Tideland. In 2016, Rock Hill sold Tideland to Xylem, a water technology company. In June 2020, Xylem announced that Tideland has ceased operations. In September 2020, Orga Signal, a Netherlands-based provider of marine navigational aids, announce that it has bought some of Tideland's intellectual property and product design assets. In April 2021, Orga Signal announced that it will continue the production of the Tideland product portfolio from the original facility in Houston.

Tideland ML-300

It consists of a single piece injection molding acrylic 300mm Fresnel lens and a base assembly, where a flasher or lamp changer can be installed. The light produced is a 360° omnidirectional beam and colored signatures are achieved by colored inserts.

Since its introduction in 1967, The ML-300 is in wide use all around the world. It is in wide use in the Great Lakes region as a medium-range lens. It is also in use in Australia by the Australian Maritime Safety Authority, for example in Dent Island Light and Bugatti Reef Light, both in Queensland.

Other products
In 2010, Tideland Signal provided SB‐30 lateral marker buoys and three DM‐390 buoys for use during the Vancouver Winter Olympics.

References

External links
 

Manufacturing companies based in Houston
Defunct companies based in Texas
Manufacturing companies established in 1954
Manufacturing companies disestablished in 2016
1954 establishments in Texas
2020 disestablishments in Texas